Monique Proulx (1947–12 August 2012) was a teacher, model, actress, journalist, and racing driver from Québec.

Biography 
Proulx was born in 1947. Her father, a Québec City horse-trainer, died when she was two years old. Proulx was also two when she contracted polio, resulting in her undergoing three operations on her legs, completed when she was 10, which left her with a limp until she was 13.

After studying education, she worked as a French teacher for 3½ years at the Commission scolaire de Laval.

Her son Stéphane was born in December 1965.

A single mother, Proulx left teaching at 21 to become a model. She appeared in several advertising campaigns on both radio and television. Clients included the Molson and Labatt breweries, Hydro-Québec and Ford Canada. The campaign that gave her the most personal satisfaction was one for nylons because of her history with polio and the previous surgeries on her legs. She also became owner of a chain of salon/spas.

Proulx began a relationship with Doctor Jacques Fortin, whom she met on a ski hill.

An accident in a Datsun 240Z on the streets of Montréal broke Proulx's leg in four places and sent her through the windshield.

In 1975 a film that Proulx was involved in was released.

In 1976 she participated in the ABC Television athletic competition "Superstars", progressing to the Women's Preliminary round.

Proulx appeared in the "Girls of Canada" feature in the October 1980 issue of Playboy magazine.

When Stéphane also became a racing driver in the 1980s, Proulx retired from racing to support his career. Stéphane died in 1993 at the age of 27.

Proulx died on 12 August 2012 at age 65.

Racing career
Proulx obtained her basic racing license at l'Association des Coureurs Automobile de Montréal (ACAM), then enrolled in the Jim Russell racing school at the Circuit Mont-Tremblant in 1970.

Initially the Canadian Auto Sports Club refused to grant her an international racing license. The dispute was finally resolved in court.

Proulx and Fortin formed Mojack Racing, and her early races were run in a modified BMW 2002 owned by Fortin, and a Datsun 240Z. She placed second in the Canadian Production endurance championship in the Datsun. That car was also used for ice racing. She finished eighth with the BMW at the Samair Trans-Am race in 1972 and fourteenth in 1973.

In 1974, when Northern NASCAR introduced the Mini Stocks class in Canada, Proulx won the very first race at Catamount Stadium track.

In 1972 she bought an open-wheeled Formula Ford. She raced in some Formula Ford and Formula Vee events, and was scouted by Fred Opert Racing, then moved up to Formula Atlantic in 1974 driving Allen Karlberg's March 712M with Kimberly-Clark as sponsor. She also was sponsored at some point by Virginia Slims. In 1975 she appeared in Formula Atlantic with sponsorship from Kotex's "New Freedom" brand products.

In Formula Atlantic Proulx drove a variety of cars including models from Ralt (RT1), Brabham (BT29), and Chevron. She raced Formula Atlantic until 1979.

In 1979 she also appeared in some Trans-Am events in a Chevrolet Camaro.

References

External links
 
 

French Quebecers
Canadian people of French descent
1947 births
2012 deaths
Place of birth missing
Place of death missing
Canadian racing drivers
Racing drivers from Quebec
Canadian female racing drivers